Sankt Paul im Lavanttal ( or Šentpavel) is a municipality of the Wolfsberg district in the Austrian state of Carinthia.

Geography
Sankt Paul lies in the Lavant River valley. A large part of the municipality lies in the Granitz River valley and in the foothills of the Saualp.

History
The village has always been under the influence of the monastery, which is still a significant economic factor today.

It was only in 1874 that the Telegraph came to St. Paul. The opening of a k.k. State telegraph station with "limited daily services" took place at the same time as in other smaller places of the monarchy.

Sights
 St. Paul's Abbey in the Lavanttal
 Ruins of Rabenstein Castle

See also
List of cities and towns in Austria

References

External links
http://www.sanktpaul.at

Cities and towns in Wolfsberg District